Nigeria is one of the largest producers of potatoes in Africa. The potato was introduced to the country in the 19th century by Christian missionaries and is largely cultivated in the central region of the country in Plateau State.

History
The Irish potato was first brought into Nigeria in the 19th century by Christian missionaries. During World War II, the colonial government encouraged Nigerian farmers to grow potatoes to feed British troops stationed in West Africa. A handful of European potato varieties, including pinepernel, ackersegen, dekema, and roslin eburu were introduced to Nigeria afterwards to little success. In the early 1970s, the State Ministry of Agriculture in Benue took in another set of varieties including ajax, mirka, spunta, Nicola, desiree, diamant, dan-Cameroon, alpha, cardinal and Baraka. In 1976, the Potato Research Programme of the National Roots Research Institute was established in Kuru, to look into ways of improving potato production in the country. In 1986, yet another set of varieties was imported into Nigeria: kondor, bertita, delcora, vento, famosa and romano.

Production

 The potato is a tuber crop which has high nutritional value. It has protein, calcium, and vitamin C. One potato of medium size contains 50 percent of the daily vitamin C needs of an adult. Its protein content is reported to be very high compared to other tubers and roots.

In spite of that, the average yield in Nigeria of 3.1 tonnes/ha is among the world's lowest.

Potato production in Nigeria predominantly occurs in small farms whose farmers still rely on traditional tools such as machetes and hoes as opposed to tractors. The country's main potato-planting region is the Plateau State (Barkin Ladi, Bokkos, and Mangu) which accounts for almost half of the national potato yield. Other potato-producing areas include Kaduna and Benue. Potato production takes place in both the wet season (April till August) and the dry season (September till March). Additionally, a low level of production occurs from October till January in Kano.

The potatoes are then graded by the Potato Research Programme. Potato production in Nigeria faces many constraints, including the unavailability of good-quality potato seeds, poor storage methods, insufficient education on farming methods and pest control, inadequate research and development, and inadequate farming equipment.

Cuisine
https://search.library.wisc.edu/digital/AE6B6RIWCWHM6C8S/pages?as=text&view=scrollFrench fries and potato crisps are widely consumed in Nigeria, with locally produced potatoes being used to make Monties and The Kings potato crisps. However, the majority of potato-based snacks in the country are still imported.

References

Citations

Bibliography

 
 

Agriculture in Nigeria
Potato production